Alba Caterina Rohrwacher is an Italian actress.

Early life
Alba Rohrwacher was born in Florence, the daughter of a German father and an Italian mother.

From the age of 17 to 21 she studied medicine, intending to be a doctor. At the age of 21 she moved to Rome to study acting at the Centro Sperimentale di Cinematografia.

Her younger sister is director Alice Rohrwacher.

Career
Her first movie role was in 2004 in L'amore ritrovato. In 2008, she was awarded the David di Donatello for Best Supporting Actress. In 2009, she received a David di Donatello for Best Actress for her performance in Pupi Avati's Giovanna's Father. At the Berlin International Film Festival 2009 she was awarded the Shooting Stars Award.

Rohrwacher worked with her sister, director Alice Rohrwacher in the 2014 film The Wonders a semi-autobiographical film in which Alba played a role loosely based on the sisters' mother.

On 6 September 2014, Rohrwacher won the Volpi Cup for Best Actress at the 71st Venice International Film Festival in Hungry Hearts, a film by Italian director Saverio Costanzo. Under the presidency of Meryl Streep, she was member of the jury of the Berlinale 2016.

Rohrwacher worked with her sister a second time on the film Happy as Lazzaro which premiered at the 2018 Cannes Film Festival.

Rohrwacher provided the narration for the series My Brilliant Friend, an adaptation of Elena Ferrante's Neapolitan Novels, and Marc Cousins' 2022 documentary March on Rome.

Personal life
 Rohrwacher was in a relationship with Italian director Saverio Costanzo.

Selected filmography

References

External links

 
 
 
 

1979 births
21st-century Italian actresses
Living people
Centro Sperimentale di Cinematografia alumni
David di Donatello winners
Italian film actresses
Italian people of German descent
Nastro d'Argento winners
Actors from Florence
Volpi Cup for Best Actress winners